National road 69 (abbreviated as DK69) was a route belonging to the Polish national road network. The highway connected Bielsko-Biała with Poland–Slovakia border in Zwardoń.

From 1986 to 2000 the route was signed as:
 national road 94 from Bielsko-Biała to Żywiec
 national road 944 from Żywiec via Milówka and Zwardoń to country border.

On August 4, 2016, the entire route has been decommissioned and included in the course of national road 1, therefore the number 69 has been removed from the national roads network.

Expressway S69 

From 2007 to 2015 on part of north-east bypass of Bielsko-Biała, Żywiec – Przybędza stretch and Milówka – Zwardoń stretch the route was modernized to be an expressway.

Major cities and towns along the route 
 Bielsko-Biała (road 52)
 Wilkowice
 Łodygowice
 Żywiec (road 945, road 946)
 Węgierska Górka
 Milówka
 Laliki (road 943)
 Zwardoń, border with Slovakia

See also 
 Expressway S1

References 

69